Dwayne O'Steen (December 20, 1954 - September 21, 2001) was an American football player who played seven seasons as a cornerback in the National Football League. He was a part of the Oakland Raiders Super Bowl XV winning team. O'Steen died in 2001 of an apparent heart attack.

External links
Obituary

1954 births
2001 deaths
Players of American football from Los Angeles
American football cornerbacks
Los Angeles Rams players
Oakland Raiders players
Baltimore Colts players
Green Bay Packers players
Tampa Bay Buccaneers players
San Jose State Spartans football players